The 48th parallel north is a circle of latitude that is 48 degrees north of the Earth's equatorial plane. It crosses Europe, Asia, the Pacific Ocean, North America, and the Atlantic Ocean.

In Canada the parallel forms part of the border between Quebec and New Brunswick.

Ships heading north along the coast of Washington toward the Strait of Juan de Fuca must make radio contact with Canadian Coast Guard vessel traffic service upon crossing the 48th parallel.

At this latitude the sun is visible for 16 hours, 3 minutes during the summer solstice and 8 hours, 22 minutes during the winter solstice. If the latitude in the northern hemisphere is 48º45′ or smaller, everyday of the month of July can view both astronomical dawn and astronomical dusk.

Around the world
Starting at the Prime Meridian and heading eastwards, the parallel 48° north passes through:

{| class="wikitable plainrowheaders"
! scope="col" width="125" | Co-ordinates
! scope="col" | Country, territory or sea
! scope="col" | Notes
|-
| 
! scope="row" | 
|Brains-sur-Gée commune, Sarthe department
|-valign="top"
| 
! scope="row" | 
| Baden-Württemberg - passing through Freiburg im Breisgau, less than 1 km north of the city centre Bavaria - passing through Lake Ammer, and passing just south of Munich
|-
| 
! scope="row" | 
|
|-
| 
! scope="row" | 
| For about 8 km
|-
| 
! scope="row" | 
|
|-
| 
! scope="row" | 
|
|-
| 
! scope="row" | 
| For about 6 km - Vynohradiv Raion
|-
| 
! scope="row" | 
| For about 4 km
|-
| 
! scope="row" | 
| For about 4 km - Vynohradiv Raion
|-
| 
! scope="row" | 
|
|-
| 
! scope="row" | 
| Zakarpattia Oblast — passing just south of Rakhiv Ivano-Frankivsk Oblast  Chernivtsi Oblast
|-
| 
! scope="row" | 
|
|-
| 
! scope="row" | 
| Passing through Transnistria
|-
| 
! scope="row" | 
| Odesa Oblast — passing just north of BaltaMykolaiv Oblast — passing just north of YuzhnoukrainskKirovohrad OblastMykolaiv Oblast — for about 8 kmKirovohrad Oblast — for about 2 kmDnipropetrovsk Oblast — passing through Kryvyi RihZaporizhzhia Oblast — passing just north of ZaporizhzhiaDonetsk Oblast — passing through DonetskLuhansk Oblast — passing just south of Dovzhansk
|-valign="top"
| 
! scope="row" | 
| Rostov Oblast Volgograd Oblast Kalmykia Astrakhan Oblast
|-
| 
! scope="row" | 
|
|-valign="top"
| 
! scope="row" | 
| Xinjiang
|-
| 
! scope="row" | 
|
|-valign="top"
| 
! scope="row" | 
| Xinjiang
|-
| 
! scope="row" | 
| Passing just north of Ulaanbaatar
|-valign="top"
| 
! scope="row" | 
| Inner Mongolia
|-
| 
! scope="row" | 
|
|-valign="top"
| 
! scope="row" | 
| Inner Mongolia Heilongjiang
|-
| 
! scope="row" | 
| Jewish Autonomous Oblast
|-valign="top"
| 
! scope="row" | 
| Heilongjiang
|-valign="top"
| 
! scope="row" | 
| Khabarovsk Krai Primorsky Krai Khabarovsk Krai
|-
| style="background:#b0e0e6;" | 
! scope="row" style="background:#b0e0e6;" | Strait of Tartary
| style="background:#b0e0e6;" |
|-
| 
! scope="row" | 
| Island of Sakhalin
|-valign="top"
| style="background:#b0e0e6;" | 
! scope="row" style="background:#b0e0e6;" | Sea of Okhotsk
| style="background:#b0e0e6;" | Passing between the islands of Rasshua and Ushishir in 's Kuril Island chain
|-
| style="background:#b0e0e6;" | 
! scope="row" style="background:#b0e0e6;" | Pacific Ocean
| style="background:#b0e0e6;" |
|-valign="top"
| 
! scope="row" | 
| Washington - Olympic Peninsula (mainland), Whidbey Island, and the mainland at Everett Idaho Montana - passing through Fort Peck Dam North Dakota - just south of Devils Lake; just north of Grand Forks Minnesota - through Red Lake
|-
| 
! scope="row" | 
| Ontario - for about 7 km
|-
| 
! scope="row" | 
| Minnesota - passing through Grand Portage State Park
|-
| 
! scope="row" | 
| Ontario - for about 2 km
|-
| style="background:#b0e0e6;" | 
! scope="row" style="background:#b0e0e6;" | Lake Superior
| style="background:#b0e0e6;" |
|-
| 
! scope="row" | 
| Michigan - Isle Royale
|-
| style="background:#b0e0e6;" | 
! scope="row" style="background:#b0e0e6;" | Lake Superior
| style="background:#b0e0e6;" |
|-valign="top"
| 
! scope="row" | 
| Ontario Quebec
|-
| style="background:#b0e0e6;" | 
! scope="row" style="background:#b0e0e6;" | Saint Lawrence River
| style="background:#b0e0e6;" |
|-valign="top"
| 
! scope="row" | 
| Quebec - Île Verte and mainland Quebec / New Brunswick border Quebec New Brunswick - passing through Campbellton
|-
| style="background:#b0e0e6;" | 
! scope="row" style="background:#b0e0e6;" | Baie des Chaleurs
| style="background:#b0e0e6;" | Just passing south of the Gaspé Peninsula, Quebec, 
|-
| 
! scope="row" | 
| New Brunswick - Miscou Island - passing just south of the Miscou Island Lighthouse
|-
| style="background:#b0e0e6;" | 
! scope="row" style="background:#b0e0e6;" | Gulf of Saint Lawrence
| style="background:#b0e0e6;" |
|-valign="top"
| 
! scope="row" | 
| Newfoundland and Labrador - island of Newfoundland. From west to east, the parallel enters the island near the Anguille Mountains then passes near the community of North Branch. Further east it passes 1 km north of the Bay d'Espoir Generating Station, and through the community of Queen's Cove.
|-
| style="background:#b0e0e6;" | 
! scope="row" style="background:#b0e0e6;" | Trinity Bay
| style="background:#b0e0e6;" |
|-valign="top"
| 
! scope="row" | 
| Newfoundland and Labrador - Bay de Verde Peninsula, island of Newfoundland (from Hants Harbour to Lower Island Cove)
|-
| style="background:#b0e0e6;" | 
! scope="row" style="background:#b0e0e6;" | Atlantic Ocean
| style="background:#b0e0e6;" |
|-
|  
! scope="row" | 
|Brittany Quimper 
|-
|}

See also
47th parallel north
49th parallel north

References

n48
Borders of Quebec
Borders of New Brunswick